Heo Yong-Mo (April 21, 1965 – March 9, 2019) was a South Korean amateur boxer.

Career
He won a Light Flyweight bronze medal at the 1982 World Amateur Boxing Championships.

Heo captured a Flyweight silver medal in the 1983 Boxing World Cup in Rome, Italy, beating Australian boxing legend Jeff Fenech by unanimous decision in the semifinals.

Next year, Heo participated in the 1984 Summer Olympics. However, he, in a major upset, lost to Eyüp Can of Turkey by split decision in the quarterfinals.

Heo served as a middle school teacher in Yeosu, Jeollanam-do.

Results

External links

1965 births
Olympic boxers of South Korea
Boxers at the 1984 Summer Olympics
2019 deaths
Asian Games medalists in boxing
Boxers at the 1982 Asian Games
South Korean male boxers
AIBA World Boxing Championships medalists
Asian Games gold medalists for South Korea
Medalists at the 1982 Asian Games
Light-flyweight boxers
20th-century South Korean people